Peter Linde (born 9 February 1946 in Karlshamn) is a Swedish sculptor. He was educated at the Royal Institute of Art in Stockholm in 1970–1975. He is a member of the Royal Swedish Academy of Fine Arts.

Linde has made many public sculptures in Sweden. These include a statue of the writer Hjalmar Söderberg situated outside the National Library in Stockholm since 2010, and a 2011 statue of the boxer Ingemar Johansson outside the stadium Ullevi in Gothenburg.

References

External links 
 Official website
 

1946 births
20th-century Swedish sculptors
21st-century sculptors
Living people
People from Karlshamn
Swedish male sculptors
21st-century Swedish male artists